Bishop Challoner School is an English independent coeducational Roman Catholic day school in Shortlands, Greater London, for children aged three to eighteen years.

History

The school started as a junior school. In 1956 a senior wing was added. More classrooms and an assembly hall/gymnasium followed in 1963. The Art block was opened in 1968 and another block – now the Junior Block – was opened in 1980. Challoner became co-educational in the Junior School in 1992, later extending into the Senior School. At the same time a Nursery was opened. In recent years the list of site improvements and development has quickened. A new sixth form study centre has been opened as well as a drama studio and new art facilities.

The school became an independent charity limited by guarantee in December 2013 (It was formerly part of the Catholic Archdiocese of Southwark). It is governed by a board of trustees. Its transition was overseen by its longest serving chair, Canon Jack Madden. In 2017, its refurbished chapel was blessed by Peter Smith, Archbishop of Southwark, and renamed "The Chapel of The Annunciation". The chapel contains four icons commissioned from the Bethlehem Icon School.

Uniform

Senior school
Boys - navy blazer, white shirt, navy jumper, navy tie and grey trousers or plaid skirt.
Girls - navy blazer, white blouse, navy jumper or cardigan and plaid skirt, or grey trousers, navy jumper/cardigan and white blouse

Junior school
Boys - maroon blazer with white shirt, maroon tie and grey trousers, navy jumper/ cardigan pinafore/skirt
Girls - maroon blazer, white blouse navy jumper/cardigan plaid skirt/pinafore. Or grey trousers maroon tie white blouse and navy jumper/ cardigan

Notable former pupils

Alex Clare, musician
Stacy Long, footballer
Bradley Pritchard, footballer
Orlando von Einsiedel, director
Arnold Pizzey, Scientist, Inventor

References

External links
Official website

1950 establishments in England
Educational institutions established in 1950
Private co-educational schools in London
Private schools in the London Borough of Bromley
Member schools of the Independent Schools Association (UK)
Roman Catholic private schools in the Archdiocese of Southwark